Balik Pulau is a town within the jurisdiction  of Penang Island City Council in the Malaysian state of Penang. Located at the southwest of Penang Island, it is also the administrative seat of the Southwest Penang Island District.

The agricultural town of Balik Pulau was established in 1794 by the British East India Company. To this day, the economy of Balik Pulau still relies heavily on agriculture; Penang's most famous produce, including nutmegs, cloves and durians, are grown and harvested in the town. These have also contributed to the town's growing tourism sector; Balik Pulau's reputation for its wide variety of durians, for instance, attracts hordes of tourists between May and August each year.

While Balik Pulau, and by extension, the western part of Penang Island, is generally seen as quieter in comparison to the bustling city centre on the other side of the island, urbanisation has also reached the town in recent years, with more residential developments being planned for this part of Penang Island.

Etymology 
Balik Pulau means 'the back of the island' in Malay. It refers to the town's location at the western side of Penang Island, geographically separated from George Town to the northeast by the island's central hills.

History 

The first clove and nutmeg plantations in Balik Pulau were set up by the British East India Company in 1794. During the early years of Company rule on Penang Island (then the Prince of Wales Island), spice cultivation was encouraged as a means to cover the administrative costs of the island. The British also intended to turn the Prince of Wales Island into a centre for spice production in Southeast Asia in order to break the Dutch monopoly of the spice trade at the time.

During the first half of the 19th century, the clove and nutmeg farms of Balik Pulau attracted Malay refugees fleeing the Siamese invasion of Kedah, as well as Chinese immigrants who were then employed at the farms.

The town centre, also known colloquially as Kongsi''' (meaning 'to share' in Malay), was apparently named after the communal wooden longhouses that once existed within the heart of Balik Pulau. Residents of various ethnicities, who worked at the plantations surrounding Balik Pulau, resided in these longhouses, hence the name. The town centre soon grew, with the addition of banks, schools, shops and a colonial fountain, which was erected in the late 19th century by a local Chinese businessman, Koh Seang Tat.

For much of its history, Balik Pulau has been a rather quiet agricultural town, in stark contrast to the busier eastern side of Penang Island where the capital city, George Town, is situated. As agriculture does not feature prominently in Penang's economy, Balik Pulau is said to have the last remaining paddy fields in all of Penang Island. On the other hand, the spillover of urbanisation from the eastern seaboard of Penang Island is also gathering pace in Balik Pulau, with residential properties are being planned for the town in recent years.

 Governance 

Balik Pulau serves as the seat of the Southwest Penang Island District, as the district's Land Office is situated within the town. Moreover, the town is also home to the district's Magistrates Court. However, as with the rest of Penang Island, Balik Pulau falls under the jurisdiction of the Penang Island City Council, which is based in George Town.

 Demographics 
According to most definitions, the town of Balik Pulau encompasses several mukims, namely Bagan Ayer Itam, Titi Teras, Kongsi, Kampong Paya, Sungai Burong, Pulau Betong, Dataran Ginting, Batu Itam, Bukit Balik Pulau and Pondok Upeh. Based on the 2010 National Census conducted by Malaysia's Department of Statistics, these mukims cumulatively contained a population of 23,559.

Ethnic Malays formed almost  of Balik Pulau's population.

 Transportation 

Balik Pulau is served by three major roads which intersect within the town centre. Jalan Balik Pulau connects the town with the fishing village of Gertak Sanggul near the southwestern tip of Penang Island. As the road is also part of the pan-island Federal Route 6 which loops around Penang Island, it also links Balik Pulau with the other major urban centres on the island.

The eastbound Jalan Tun Sardon stretches through the island's central hills, providing a more direct link towards Paya Terubong and Bukit Jambul, while the north-bound Jalan Sungai Pinang leads towards Teluk Bahang near the northwestern tip of Penang Island.

In addition, six Rapid Penang bus routes include stops within Balik Pulau - 401, 401E, 403, 404, 501 and 502. These bus routes link Balik Pulau with George Town, the Penang International Airport, Queensbay Mall, Bayan Baru and Teluk Bahang. Aside from these routes, in 2018, Rapid Penang launched a free-of-charge transit service within Balik Pulau, known as the Congestion Alleviation Transport (CAT).

 Education 
Balik Pulau contains 17 primary schools, five high schools, an Islamic religious school, a government-run vocational college and an international school.Primary schoolsHigh schoolsIslamic school SMA Maahad Al Mashoor Al IslamiVocational college Kolej Vokasional Balik PulauInternational school'''
 Prince of Wales Island International School (POWIIS)
Aside from these institutions, the Penang State Library also operates a branch within Balik Pulau.

Health care 
The basic health care needs of Balik Pulau's residents are served by the Balik Pulau Hospital, a public hospital located within the town. Run by Malaysia's Ministry of Health, it is one of the six public hospitals within the State of Penang. The hospital is equipped with 71 beds and provides, among others, haemodialysis, emergency and infectious disease control services.

Tourist attractions 

Balik Pulau's attractions are more agricultural, alluding to the huge role agriculture has played in the town's economy and its laid-back pace of life. The town is famous for some of Penang's most well-known products - nutmegs, durians and cloves. In recent years, agricultural tourism is booming in Balik Pulau, as tourists from other states and abroad flock to the town to sample fresh durians and nutmegs. For instance, Balik Pulau's durian orchards, which produce a wide variety of durian cultivars, are best visited during the durian harvesting season between May and August each year. Balik Pulau's nutmeg farms and shops also offer samples of nutmeg fruits and products, including nutmeg juice.

See also 
 Pantai Acheh

References

External links

Southwest Penang Island District
Towns in Penang